Gabriela Mihalschi (born 22 July 1987 in Târgu Neamț) is a Romanian handballer. She plays for the Romanian club CSM Bistrița.

References

1987 births
Living people
People from Târgu Neamț
Romanian female handball players
CS Minaur Baia Mare (women's handball) players